Following is a list of antipsychotics, sorted by class.

Antipsychotics

Antipsychotic esters

Typical antipsychotics
 Bromperidol decanoate
 Clopenthixol decanoate
 Flupentixol decanoate
 Flupentixol palmitate
 Fluphenazine decanoate
 Fluphenazine enanthate
 Haloperidol decanoate
 Oxyprothepin decanoate
 Perphenazine decanoate
 Perphenazine enanthate
 Pipotiazine palmitate
 Pipotiazine undecylenate
 Zuclopenthixol acetate
 Zuclopenthixol decanoate

Atypical antipsychotics
 Aripiprazole lauroxil
 Paliperidone palmitate

See also
 ATC code N05A

References

External links
 DrugBank
 WHO ATC codes N05A

Antipsychotics